Eloy José Arenas Azorín (born 19 February 1977) is a Spanish film, theatre and television actor. He appeared in movies like All About My Mother (1999), Cuba (1999), Mad Love (2001), Guerreros (2001), Kisses for Everyone (2002), The Borgia (2006) and No me pidas que te bese, porque te besaré (2008). He also appeared in many Spanish TV series such as Gran Hotel (2011–2013) as Javier Alarcón, Sin identidad (2014–2015) as Pablo, Apaches (2017) as Sastre and High Seas (2019–2020) as Fernando Fábregas. In Theater he has starred in plays like The Picture of Dorian Gray (2004) as Dorian Gray and Cat on a Hot tin Roof (2016-2017) as Brick.

Biography 
Eloy was born in Madrid in 19th of February, 1977. He is the son of comedian Eloy Arenas and the artist representative Amelia Azorín, who represented her son through her company Camelion from the beginning of his career until her retirement in 2016. 

Thanks to his father he got to know show business from within, a profession that runs through his veins since he was very young. With five year old Eloy Azorín did a small appearance in a TV program presented by Joaquín Prat and featuring Eloy Arenas, in which he interrupts his father and ends the show saying goodbye to the audience. 

Eloy studied at the Escuela Superior de Arte Dramático de Madrid, and his first film appearance was as at the age of 19 as the protagonist of "Como un relámpago" (1996) where he shared the bill with Santiago Ramos and Assumpta Serna, directed by Miguel Hermoso. His big break came with "Todo sobre mi madre" (1999), by Pedro Almodóvar, which was awarded the Oscar for best foreign-language film. In this movie, Eloy Azorín plays Esteban, the son of Manuela (Cecilia Roth) whom he asks, as a gift for his eighteenth birthday, to tell him everything about his father, whom he never knew. He has starred in many movies and TV series since then, having won a Best Actor award in the Peñíscola International Comedy Film Festival for his role as Ramón in the movie "Besos para todos".

Filmography

Cinema 
{| class="wikitable"
|+
!Year
!Original title (English title)
!Role
|-
|1996
|Como un relámpago (As a Bolt of Lightning)
|Pablo
|-
|1998
|Atómica (Atomic)
|Ricardo
|-
|1999
|Todo sobre mi madre (All About My Mother)
|Esteban
|-
|2000
|' (Even Though You Don't Know)
|Nacho
|-
|2000
|Besos para todos (Kisses for Everyone)
|Ramón
|-
|2001
|Juana la loca (Mad Love)
|Álvaro de Estúñiga
|-
|2002
|Guerreros (Warriors)
|Soldado Vidal
|-
|2004
|El año del diluvio (The Year of the Flood)
|Bartolo
|-
|2004
|A+ (Amas) (A+ (Aplus))
|Ace
|-
|2006
|Skizo|Gorka
|-
|2006
|Los Borgia (The Borgia)
|Jofré Borgia
|-
|2008
| (Don't ask me to kiss you, because I will)
|Albert
|-
|2010
|Todas las canciones hablan de mí (Every Song Is About Me)
|Nico
|-
|2014
| (Millionaire Dog)
|Pedro
|-
|2019
| (Get Her... If You Can)
|party guest
|-
|2022
|Jaula (2022)
|Beltrán
|}

 Short films 

Theatre

Television

 Acting in music videos 

 Awards 
 Ercilla Revelation Prize (2004)
 Best Actor in the Peñíscola International Comedy Film Festival for Besos para todos''.

References 

1977 births
Living people
Spanish male film actors
20th-century Spanish male actors
21st-century Spanish male actors
Spanish male stage actors
Spanish male television actors